Robat-e Olya or Robat Olya may refer to:
 Robat-e Olya, Khuzestan
 Robat-e Olya, Markazi

See also
 Robat (disambiguation)
 Robat-e Sofla (disambiguation)